Republic (stylised as Republic©) is the sixth studio album by English rock band New Order. It was first released on 3 May 1993 in the United Kingdom by CentreDate Co Ltd in association with London Records and on 11 May 1993 in the United States by Qwest and Warner Bros. Records. It was the band's first album following the demise of their former label Factory Records, and would be their last studio album for eight years until 2001's Get Ready.

Republic became New Order's second consecutive album to top the UK Albums Chart, and was nominated for the 1993 Mercury Music Prize. In the United States, it reached number 11 on the Billboard 200, the band's highest-peaking album on the chart to date. Its lead single "Regret" became New Order's last top-five entry on the UK Singles Chart. The band went on hiatus following a gig at the Reading Festival in promotion of the album in August 1993. Lead singer Bernard Sumner was known to dislike travelling to North America, and media reports suggested that the pressure of the long leg there contributed to the band's temporary demise, although they reunited in 1998.

Background 
According to bassist Peter Hook, the band were forced to make the album in order to save The Haçienda, a Manchester club partially owned by the band that was losing a great deal of money. The band were also told that if they did not produce another album, Factory Records would go bankrupt and the band members, who had guaranteed loans for Factory and the club, would be ruined financially.

At the same time, Hook and Bernard Sumner were "at that point in the relationship where you hate each others' stinking guts," and the band members were "all off our heads on various things," which made for a stressful working environment. Disputes over the music and publishing rights created further acrimony that caused the band to break up, though they reunited in 1998 and recorded two more studio albums before Hook departed permanently.

Artwork
As with previous New Order releases, Republic's artwork was designed by Peter Saville and no text other than credits appears within the sleeve. Saville, who had relocated to California, depicted different aspects of the state—people relaxing on the beach while houses burn (a reference to frequent wildfires or the 1992 Los Angeles riots) and vast natural landscapes contrasting with the skyline of Los Angeles. Most of the images were taken from stock photo libraries to achieve a commercial look, and were heavily retouched. Several of these images have been used elsewhere, such as direct-mail campaigns, catalogues and adverts for businesses. Another interpretation of the album's artwork alludes to the Fall of Rome.

Republic: The Limited Run..
A limited-edition version of Republic, titled Republic: The Limited Run.., was released in the United States. Although the tracks are the same as on the standard release, the packaging is entirely different. Instead of including a jewel case, the CD is packaged in a folding wallet made of bright orange vinyl underpadded with soft foam, giving it the feel of an inner tube. The CD's label is also redesigned, with no words but with a picture of several orange rubber inner tubes against a background of flames, a reference to the cover artwork. The booklet, tucked into a pocket of the vinyl wallet, is the same as with the standard version, but is made of a plastic waterproof material instead of paper.

Track listing

Personnel

New Order
Musician credits for New Order are not listed in the liner notes of the album's personnel. Below are the instruments that the group typically plays.

 Bernard Sumner – vocals, guitars, synthesizers and programming
 Peter Hook – bass, programming
 Stephen Morris – drums, synthesizers and programming
 Gillian Gilbert – synthesizers, guitars and programming; vocal on "Avalanche"

Production
The original liner notes list the album's personnel as follows:

 Gillian Gilbert, Peter Hook, Stephen Morris, Bernard Sumner and Stephen Hague – writer
 New Order and Stephen Hague – producer
 Pascal Gabriel – pre-production ("Regret" and "Young Offender")
 Simon Gogerly, Mike 'Spike' Drake, Owen Morris and Richard Chappell – engineer
 Ben Findlay – assistant engineer
 Sam Hardaker – assistant engineer
 Audrey Riley – cello, string arrangements
 David Rhodes – additional guitar
 Andy Duncan – additional programming
 Dee Lewis – backing vocals
 Recorded and mixed at Real World and RAK
 Peter Saville – art direction (designed at Pentagram)

Charts

Weekly charts

Year-end charts

Certifications

References

External links

1993 albums
New Order (band) albums
London Records albums
Albums produced by Pascal Gabriel
Albums produced by Stephen Hague
Albums recorded at RAK Studios